Somersville may refer to:

Somersville, California
Somersville, Connecticut
Somersville, Ohio
Somersville Historic District, in Somers, Connecticut
Somersville Towne Center, a regional shopping mall in Antioch, California

See also
Somerville (disambiguation)
Summersville (disambiguation)